The Indian cricket team toured South Africa from 5 to 30 December 2013, playing three One Day Internationals (ODI) and the two Test matches against the hosts. The Indian team was led by Mahendra Singh Dhoni while South Africa was captained by AB de Villiers (for ODIs) and Graeme Smith (for Tests). The tour began with the three-match ODI series, with South Africa winning the series 2–0. Quinton de Kock, South Africa's wicket-keeper became the fifth player to score three centuries in consecutive innings of ODIs. South Africa won the Test series 1–0, the first Test ending in a draw. Jacques Kallis, the country's most prolific run-scorer in Tests, announced his retirement from the format after the second Test at Durban.

Squads

ODI series

1st ODI

2nd ODI

3rd ODI

Tour match

Test series

First Test

The Test was India's first after the retirement of Sachin Tendulkar. After opting to bat, India posted 280 runs in the first innings. In return, South Africa made 244. India in their second innings went on to score 421 runs with Cheteshwar Pujara scoring 153 and Virat Kohli making 96, falling four runs short of becoming the first Indian no.4 to hit centuries in both innings of a test match. Their 222-run stand is the highest for India in South Africa in tests. Chasing a target of 458 runs, South Africa ended up with 450 runs for the loss of seven wickets, leading to a draw. The team's total of 450, is the second-highest fourth-innings score to draw a match and third overall. Francois du Plessis and AB de Villiers made centuries in the South Africa total. Described as one among the "closest draws", the fourth innings total of 450 made by South Africa is the second-highest by a team in a drawn match and third overall. During the match, wicket-keepers from both the teams bowled, making it the first time to happen in the history of Test cricket. Described as one of the "Closest draws", the match saw a few players from both sides achieving significant milestones in their careers – India's Zaheer Khan became the fourth Indian to capture 300 wickets in Test cricket. Vernon Philander playing in his 19th Test match, became the fastest bowler to take 100 wickets for South Africa. The Test also marked the eighth occasion where Indian spinners failed to pick up a single wicket.

Second Test

Statistics
South Africa
Vernon Philander took his 100th Test wicket when he got Shikhar Dhawan out in the 2nd innings of the 1st Test.
Faf du Plessis made his 3rd Test century in the second innings of the 1st Test.
AB de Villiers made his 18th Test century in the second innings of the 1st Test.
Jacques Kallis made his 45th Test century in the first innings of the 2nd Test.

India
Virat Kohli made his 5th Test century in the first innings of the 1st Test.
Cheteshwar Pujara made his 6th Test century in the second innings of the 1st Test.
Zaheer Khan took his 300th Test wicket when he got Jacques Kallis out in the 2nd innings of the 1st Test.

Notes

References

External links
 India in South Africa on ESPNcricinfo
 India tour of South Africa 2013–14 on Wisden India

2013 in South African cricket
South
2013-14
2013–14 South African cricket season
International cricket competitions in 2013–14